Gassol is a Local Government Area in Taraba State, Nigeria. Its headquarters are in the town of Mutum Biyu (or Mutumbiyu or Mutum Mbiyu) on the A4 highway at.

It has an area of 5,548 km and a population of 244,749 at the 2006 census.

The postal code of the area is 672.

The northern border of Gassol is the Benue River and the Taraba River flows north through the area to its confluence with the Benue.

Gassol is one of the sixteen LGAs of Taraba State whose majority population is the Jukun, Wurkun, Fulani and Tiv people, it is regarded as the hub of agriculture in Taraba with fulani rearing great herds of cattle while the Tiv and Jukun cultivate much yam making Dan-Anacha to have the biggest yam market in Taraba State, Dan-Anacha yam market. Fishing activities are greatly carried out by the Jukun Wanu people in Tella, one of the major towns in the LGA. Due to ethnic conflicts, there have been attempts to rename Dan-Anacha to Kwararafa though rejected by some people who believe it could be intended to favour a specific ethnic group.

References

Local Government Areas in Taraba State